Felix Komolong (born 6 March 1997) is a Papua New Guinean footballer who plays as a defender for Canterbury United of the ASB Premiership. He made his debut for the national team on March 24, 2016 in their 2–0 loss against the Solomon Islands.

Personal
Komolong is of German and PNG parentage. He is the son of Birte and Miok Komolong. Some of his grandparents, cousins, and other family live in Hütten, Schleswig-Holstein. Komolong lived in Germany with his family for a year and a half beginning at age 12. He has one older and younger brother, Alwin and Kusuga.

Career
In 2014, Felix had a 3-week trial with Werder Bremen. He played club football with Papua New Guinea top club Hekari United. In October 2016, Komolong signed for Canterbury United FC of the ASB Premiership. He made his league debut for the club on Matchday 1 of the season, coming on for the final 8 minutes of a 2–2 draw with Tasman United.

In July 2017 it was announced that Felix was following in his brother's footsteps and had decided to play college soccer for the Norse of Northern Kentucky University beginning with the 2017 season after graduating from King's College in 2015. In February 2020, both Komolong brothers signed for Lae City.

References

External links
 
 

Living people
1997 births
Papua New Guinean footballers
Papua New Guinea international footballers
Association football defenders
Papua New Guinean people of German descent
People from Morobe Province
Hekari United players
Canterbury United players
2016 OFC Nations Cup players
Northern Kentucky Norse men's soccer players
Papua New Guinean expatriate footballers
Expatriate association footballers in New Zealand
Expatriate soccer players in the United States
Papua New Guinean expatriate sportspeople in New Zealand
Papua New Guinean expatriate sportspeople in the United States